Morten Rieker (born 11 December 1940) is a Norwegian sailor. He was born in Oslo. He competed at the 1976 Summer Olympics in Montreal where he placed 16th in three-person keelboat, together with Kim Torkildsen and Peder Lunde Jr.

References

1940 births
Living people
Sportspeople from Oslo
Norwegian male sailors (sport)
Olympic sailors of Norway
Sailors at the 1976 Summer Olympics – Soling